This page is a list of internal hub gears for bicycles.

References

 
Cycling-related lists
Technological comparisons
Bicycle parts